A National Adaptation Programme of Action (NAPA) is a type of plan submitted to the United Nations Framework Convention on Climate Change (UNFCCC) by least developed countries, to describe the country's perception of its most "urgent and immediate needs to adapt to climate change". NAPAs are not supposed to include original research, but use existing information and include profiles of priority projects that are intended to address those needs that have been identified.

The UNFCCC maintains a database of NAPAs, and of country priorities that have been identified within NAPAs. As of November 2011, it contained reports from 46 LDCs.

The Least Developed Countries Fund (LDCF) was established to finance the preparation of NAPAs and to implement the projects that they propose. The LDCF currently has resources of at least US$415 million, of which US$177 million has been approved for 47 projects, attracting more than US$550 million in co-financing in the process.

Details
NAPAs are intended to provide LDCs with an opportunity to identify their "urgent and immediate needs" for adapting to climate change. As part of the NAPA process, LDC government ministries, typically assisted by development agencies, assess their countries' vulnerability to climate change and extreme weather events. LDCs then develop a prioritized list of adaptation projects that will help the country cope with the adverse effects of climate change. LDCs who submit NAPAs to the UNFCCC then become eligible for funding through the LDCF for NAPA projects. The LDCF was designed through the UNFCCC specifically to assist least developed countries, which are particularly vulnerable to the effects of climate change. To date, forty five LDCs have written and submitted NAPAs to the UNFCCC, with Nepal as the latest country to submit its NAPA in November 2010. Three more countries (Angola, Myanmar, and Timor Leste) are scheduled to complete their NAPAs by the end of 2011.

See also 
 Local Adaptation Plans of Action
 Climate change adaptation

References

Climate change policy